Kleiner Arbersee is a lake in the Bavarian Forest, Bavaria, Germany. It lies at an elevation of 918 m and has a surface area of 9.4 ha.

Lakes of Bavaria
Bohemian Forest